Burabay, formerly Borovoye, is a settlement in Burabay District, Akmola Region, Kazakhstan. It is the administrative center of the Burabay rural district (KATO code - 117035100). Population:   

Burabay is a spa town. The surrounding area is part of the Burabay National Park.

Geography 
Burabay lies in the Kokshetau Massif, part of the Kokshetau Hills of the Kazakh Uplands. The town is located in the strip of land between lakes Burabay and Ulken Shabakty.

See also
Kokshetau Lakes

References

External links

Burabay National Park (in Russian)

Populated places in Akmola Region
Spa towns
Kazakh Uplands

de:Burabai
fr:Bourabay